Thirichadi is a 1968 Indian Malayalam-language film, directed and produced by Kunchacko. The film stars Prem Nazir, Sheela, Adoor Bhasi and Adoor Pankajam.

Cast

Prem Nazir as Kuttappan, Venu (double role)
Sheela as Ramani
Adoor Bhasi as  Anthappan
Adoor Pankajam as Ammukutti
Bahadoor as Gopalan
Devaki as Kuttappan's mother
Kaduvakulam Antony as Appunni
Kottarakkara Sreedharan Nair as Venu's father
N. Govindankutty as Ramani's father
Pankajavalli as Bharathi
S. P. Pillai as P. C. Chacko
Manavalan Joseph as Naanu Kaniyan
 Kanchana (old)

Soundtrack
The music was composed by R. Sudarsanam and the lyrics were written by Vayalar Ramavarma.

References

External links
 

1968 films
1960s Malayalam-language films
Films scored by R. Sudarsanam